Ficus watkinsiana, commonly known as strangler fig, Watkins' fig, nipple fig or the green-leaved Moreton Bay fig is a hemiepiphytic fig that is endemic to Australia. The species exists in three populations—one in northeast Queensland and the others in southeast Queensland and northeast New South Wales.
It also has been introduced to Kauai island (Hawaiʻi).

The pollinator of this species in Australia is Pleistodontes nigriventris (Girault).
On Kauai island, Port Jackson fig wasps (Pleistodontes imperialis) are able to do the job as substitute pollinators. The wasps and the strangler figs have a mutualistic symbiotic relationship. The wasp, P. imperialis, uses the tree to lay eggs into its ostioles, while the tree uses the wasp for pollination. The arrangement of the inner ostioles show convergent evolution in attraction of the wasps. Other species of the strangler fig species have homoplasy of the ostioles, so the wasp is strongly influenced by this genus of plants, and therefore enhances their growth.

Description

It begins life as a hemiepiphyte. F. watkinsiana grows on another tree, using it as physical support, while also stealing sunlight, nutrients, space, etc. from it, which eventually kills the host plant. F. watkinsiana produces a large amount of fruit, which feeds a variety of mammals. Those mammals eat their seeds, defecating them throughout the rainforests so that Ficus watkinsiana has a high rate of dispersal, covering almost every square meter of the rainforest. The bigger the tree, the more surface area it has, the more dispersal it will have. Some host trees have developed possible defense mechanisms against the strangler figs. One mechanism may be lacking deep branches and hollows, and having smooth bark so there's no place for the seeds to become lodged and grow.

References

Rosales of Australia
Trees of Australia
Flora of Queensland
Flora of New South Wales
watkinsiana
Epiphytes